The following is a list of notable jam bands, or bands on the jam-band circuit. Jam band performances often feature extended musical improvisation ("jams") over rhythmic grooves and chord patterns, and long sets of music that cross genre boundaries.

Jam bands

0–9

 7 Walkers

A

 Acoustic Syndicate
 Al and The Transamericans
 Allman Brothers Band
 Amfibian
 Animal Liberation Orchestra
 Aquarium Rescue Unit
 Aqueous
 Assembly of Dust
 Ataxia

B

 Back Door Slam
 BADBADNOTGOOD
 The Band
 Band of Gypsys
 Banyan
 Barefoot Truth
 Béla Fleck and the Flecktones
 Benevento/Russo Duo
 Bernie Worrell & the WOO Warriors
 Big Something
 Big Tasty
 Billy Strings
 Big Head Todd and the Monsters
 Billy and the Kids
 The Big Wu
 BK3
 Black Midi
 The Black Crowes
 Blackberry Smoke
 Blues Project
 Blues Traveler
 Bobby and the Midnites
 The Bomb Squad
 BoomBox
 The Brakes
 The Brew
 The Bridge
 Buckethead
 Brothers Past

C

 The Cardinals
 Carl Broemel
 Caravan
 CBDB
 Centipede
 Chris Robinson Brotherhood
 Clutch
 The Codetalkers
 Colonel Claypool's Bucket of Bernie Brains
 Colonel Les Claypool's Fearless Flying Frog Brigade
 Consider the Source
 Country Joe and the Fish

D

 Dark Star Orchestra
 Dave Matthews Band
 David Nelson Band
 The Dead
 Dead & Company
 Deep Banana Blackout
 Derek and the Dominos
 Derek Trucks Band
 The Dirty Dozen Brass Band
 The Disco Biscuits
 Dispatch
 Donavon Frankenreiter
 Donna Jean Godchaux Band
 Dopapod
 DJ Logic
 Donna the Buffalo
 Dr. Dan Matrazzo and the Looters
The Doobie Brothers

E

 The Egg
 Ekoostik hookah
 El Michels Affair
 Electric Apricot
 ELO
 The Electric Co.
 EOTO
 The Expendables

F

 Family Groove Company
 Fat Freddy's Drop
 Freddy Jones Band
 Fungus Amungus
 Furthur
 Future Rock

G

 G. Love & Special Sauce
 G-Nome Project
 Gabe Dixon Band
 Galactic
 Garage A Trois
 Garaj Mahal
 Ghosts of Jupiter
 Ghost Light
 Giant Panda Guerilla Dub Squad
 Glass Harp
 God Street Wine
 Gong
 Goose
 Gov't Mule
 Grateful Dead
 Grace Potter and the Nocturnals
 The Grapes
 Greensky Bluegrass

H

 Heart of Gold Band
 The Heavy Pets
 Hootie & the Blowfish
 Hot Buttered Rum
 Hot Tuna
 Hypnotic Clambake

I

 Infamous Stringdusters
 Ivan Neville's Dumpstaphunk

J

 Jack Johnson
 Jacob Fred Jazz Odyssey
 Jam Camp
 Jazz Is Dead
 Jazz Mandolin Project
 Jefferson Airplane
 Jerry Garcia Acoustic Band
 Jerry Garcia Band
 JGB
 The Jimi Hendrix Experience
 The Jimmy Swift Band
 Joe Russo's Almost Dead
 John Brown's Body
 The John Butler Trio
 Jupiter Coyote

K

 Kale
 Karl Denson's Tiny Universe
 Keller Williams
 Khruangbin
 Kingfish
 Kikagaku Moyo
 Kudzu Kings
 KVHW
 King Gizzard & the Lizard Wizard

L

 Lake Trout
 Leaf Hound
 Leftover Salmon
 Legion of Mary
 Les Claypool
 Lettuce
 Little Barrie
 Little Feat
 Liquid Soul
 Lotus

M

 Maktub
 Man
 The Marshall Tucker Band
 Matisyahu
 Matt Schofield
 Max Creek
 The McLovins
 Medeski Martin & Wood
 Medeski Scofield Martin & Wood
 Mercury Rev
 Michael Franti & Spearhead
 Mickey Hart
 Mike Gordon
 moe.
 Mofro
 Molly Hatchet
 Moshav 
 The Motet
 The Mother Hips
 Moon Taxi
 Mr. Blotto
 Mungion
 My Morning Jacket

N

 New Deal
 New Grass Revival
 New Riders of the Purple Sage
 New Monsoon
 Nickel Creek
 North Mississippi All-Stars
 The New Mastersounds

O

 Old & In the Way
 Oteil Burbridge
 The Other Ones
 Oysterhead
 Ozric Tentacles
 O.A.R.

P

 Particle
 Pat McGee Band
 Paul Butterfield Blues Band
 Pavement
 Perpetual Groove
 Phil Lesh and Friends
 Phish
 Pigeons Playing Ping Pong
 Polyphonic Spree
 Pnuma Trio
 Pseudopod

Q
 The Quark Alliance
 Quicksilver Messenger Service

R

 The Radiators
 Railroad Earth
 RAQ
 Ratdog
 Reconstruction
 Return To Forever
 Rhythm Devils
 Robert Randolph and the Family Band
 Rodrigo Y Gabriela
 Roster McCabe
 Refrigerator
 Rubber Souldiers
 Rusted Root
 RX Bandits

S

 Santana
 The Samples
 Schleigho
 SerialPod
 Sister Hazel
 Slightly Stoopid
 The Slip
 Soulhat
 Soulfarm
 Soulive
 Soul Rebels Brass Band
 Sound Tribe Sector 9
 Spafford
 Spyro Gyra
 The Spin Doctors
 State Radio
 Steve Kimock Band
 Stockholm Syndrome
 Strangefolk
 The String Cheese Incident
 Sublime

T

 Tauk
 Tea Leaf Green
 Tedeschi Trucks Band
 Ten Ton Chicken
 Ten Years After
 The Bright Light Social Hour
 The New Mastersounds
 Traffic
 Trey Anastasio Band
 Trigon 
 Twiddle
 Traveling Wilburys

U

 Umoja Orchestra
 Umphrey's McGee

V

 Vampire Weekend
 Vetiver
 Vida Blue
 Vulfpeck

W

 War (American band)
 The Waybacks
 The Werks
 Widespread Panic
 Cory Wong
 The Word

X
 Xavier Rudd

Y

 Yonder Mountain String Band

Z

 Zach Gill
 Zero
 Zilla
 ZOX

See also

 Lists of musicians
 List of guitars

References

 
Jam bands